Pardes Rimonim (meaning "Pardes-Orchard of Pomegranates", sometimes known as the Pardes) is a primary text of Kabbalah, composed in 1548 by the Jewish mystic Moses ben Jacob Cordovero in Safed, Galilee. 16th century Safed saw the theoretical systemisation of previous Kabbalistic theosophical views. Pardes Rimonim was the first comprehensive exposition of Medieval Kabbalah, though its rationally influenced scheme was superseded by the subsequent 16th century Safed mythological scheme of Isaac Luria.

Cordovero indicates in his introduction that the work is based upon notes he took during his study of the Zohar, the foundational work of the Kabbalah. He notes that he composed the Pardes Rimonim "in order not to become lost and confused in its [the Zohar] depths". 

The work is an encyclopedic summary of the Kabbalah, including an effort to "elucidate all the tenets of the Cabala, such as the doctrines of the sefirot, emanation, the divine names, the import and significance of the alphabet, etc." The Pardes Rimonim was one of the most widely read and influential Kabbalistic works.  It was a considered a basis of the Kabbalistic outlook until ultimately being overshadowed by the works of Isaac Luria.

The Pardes Rimmonim is composed of 32 gates or sections, subdivided into chapters. It was first published at Cracow in 1591. A précis of it was published under the title Asis Rimmonim, by Samuel Gallico; and subsequent commentaries on some parts of it were written by Menahem Azariah da Fano, Mordecai Prszybram, and Isaiah Horowitz. The original work was partly translated into Latin by Bartolocci, by Joseph Ciantes (in De Sanctissima Trinitate Contra Judæos, Rome, 1664), by Athanasius Kircher (Rome, 1652–54), and by Knorr von Rosenroth (in Kabbala Denudata, Sulzbach, 1677).

See also 

 Primary texts of Kabbalah
 Meir ibn Gabbai

References 

1548 compositions
Kabbalah texts
Hebrew-language names